The FFSA Super League was the highest state-level soccer competition in South Australia between 2006 and 2012. Prior to the 2006 season, the highest level competition in South Australia was the SASF Premier League. Due to the manifestation of a new governing body, Football Federation Australia the SASF ceased operations. Nationally, it was one grade lower than the A-League. It was conducted by the Football Federation of South Australia (FFSA), the state's governing body. Each season the bottom two Super League clubs were relegated to the FFSA Premier League. The final champions in 2012 where the Adelaide Blue Eagles.

League disbandment
In 2012 it was announced that the FFSA Super League would become defunct and that the second tier league named FFSA Premier League would become the top tier of South Australian football. It was decided that the new Premier League would consist of 14 teams. All 10 clubs from the Super League and the 4 top placed sides from the 2012 Premier League table would make up the new competition.

2012 Super League Clubs

Champions and premiers

Finals Series

League Winners

Notes

References

External links
 Football Federation of SA Official website
 Weltfussballarchiv

 
1
Defunct soccer leagues in Australia
Sports leagues established in 2005
2005 establishments in Australia